Trigger Law is a 1944 American Western film directed by Vernon Keays and starring Hoot Gibson, Bob Steele and Beatrice Gray.

Cast
 Hoot Gibson as Hoot Gibson 
 Bob Steele as Bob Steele
 Beatrice Gray as Sally Buchanan 
 Ralph Lewis as Tom Buchanan 
 Ed Cassidy as Johnson 
 Jack Ingram as Kelso McGuire 
 George Eldredge as Corey 
 Pierce Lyden as Ace 
 Lane Chandler as Tex 
 Bud Osborne as Furness 
 George Morrell as Keno 
 Terry Frost as Randall

References

Bibliography
 Martin, Len D. The Allied Artists Checklist: The Feature Films and Short Subjects of Allied Artists Pictures Corporation, 1947-1978. McFarland & Company, 1993.

External links
 

1944 films
1944 Western (genre) films
American Western (genre) films
Films directed by Vernon Keays
Monogram Pictures films
American black-and-white films
1940s English-language films
1940s American films